Gonotropis dorsalis is a species of fungus weevil in the family of beetles known as Anthribidae.

References

Further reading

External links

 

Anthribidae
Beetles described in 1796